Samba Diakité (born 24 January 1989) is a French-born Malian professional footballer who plays as a midfielder for Kuwaiti club Al Tadhamon SC. Between 2012 and 2013 he made nine appearances for the Mali national team.

Club career

Early career
Diakité played for Le Bourget and Torcy, before joining Nancy in 2007.

Nancy
On 27 December 2009, he signed his first professional contract after agreeing to a two-year deal with Nancy. He made his professional debut on 27 January 2010 in a Coupe de France match against Plabennec.

Queens Park Rangers (loan)
On 29 January 2012, he agreed a deal to join Premier League team Queens Park Rangers on loan for the remainder of the season with a view to a permanent switch in the summer of 2012. He made his debut on 25 February 2012 in a 1–0 defeat, at home against Fulham, where he was sent-off after just 33 minutes for a second bookable offence. Diakité scored his first goal, a winning goal, for Queens Park Rangers in a 2–1 victory over London rivals Arsenal on 31 March 2012.

Queens Park Rangers
On 27 June 2012, it was announced by Queens Park Rangers that they had completed the permanent signing of Diakité on a four-year deal for an undisclosed fee believed to be £3.5 million. Up until his loan move to Watford, he made 14 appearances for the R's that season.

Watford (loan)
On 31 January 2014, Diakité joined Watford on loan for the remainder of the 2013–14 season.

Diakité made his Watford debut as an 88th-minute substitute for Cristian Battocchio in the 2-0 win over Brighton on 2 February 2014.

However, on his full debut against Middlesbrough on 15 February 2014, Diakité was shown a straight red card early in the second half for a two-footed lunge on Dean Whitehead.

Ittihad (loan)
On 19 July 2014, Diakité joined Ittihad on a season long loan. He was recalled by Queens Park Rangers at the end of the January transfer window, having made seven appearances and scoring one goal during his time at the Saudi Arabian club.

Al Tadhamon
In 2020, Diakité joined Kuwaiti club Al Tadhamon SC.

International career
On 24 January 2012, he made his senior international debut for Mali at the 2012 Africa Cup of Nations, in the 1–0 victory against Guinea. In total, he has made nineteen appearances for his country, scoring four goals. His form for his country in the tournament helped them reach the semi-finals, and helped earn him a move to Queens Park Rangers.

Career statistics

Club

International

Honours
Mali
Africa Cup of Nations bronze: 2013

References

External links
 
 
 
 
 

1989 births
Living people
People from Montfermeil
Footballers from Seine-Saint-Denis
French footballers
French sportspeople of Malian descent
Citizens of Mali through descent
Malian footballers
Association football midfielders
Mali international footballers
2012 Africa Cup of Nations players
2013 Africa Cup of Nations players
AS Nancy Lorraine players
Queens Park Rangers F.C. players
Watford F.C. players
Ittihad FC players
Red Star F.C. players
Al Tadhamon SC players
Premier League players
English Football League players
Saudi Professional League players
Kuwait Premier League players
Ligue 1 players
Ligue 2 players
Championnat National players
Malian expatriate footballers
Malian expatriate sportspeople in France
Expatriate footballers in France
Malian expatriate sportspeople in England
Expatriate footballers in England
Malian expatriate sportspeople in Saudi Arabia
Expatriate footballers in Saudi Arabia
Malian expatriate sportspeople in Kuwait
Expatriate footballers in Kuwait